David John Lee (born 26 November 1969) is an English football coach and former professional player.

Lee played as a defender from 1988 until 2004, notably played in the Premier League for Chelsea and in the Australian top flight for Parramatta Power. He also played in the Football League for Reading, Plymouth Argyle, Portsmouth, Sheffield United, Bristol Rovers, Crystal Palace, Colchester United and Exeter City. He then went on to play in Non-league for Havant & Waterlooville, Forest Green Rovers, Weston-super-Mare, Yate Town and Mangotsfield United. He was capped ten times by England U21.

After retiring became a scout for Bristol City and later assistant manager of Northampton Town where he briefly managed in a caretaker role.

Playing career
Lee spent most of his career at Chelsea, whom he joined as a junior in 1983. He made his club debut on 1 October 1988 against Leicester City, scoring in a 2–1 win. In ten years with Chelsea, Lee made 196 appearances, but struggled to cement a regular place in the starting line-up. As a result, his time with Chelsea was punctuated by brief loan spells with Reading, Plymouth Argyle, Portsmouth and Sheffield United. He only made one league appearance in his final full season with Chelsea (1997/98), playing the full 90 minutes of a 3–1 defeat at Leeds United on 8 April 1998. This was his first league game since playing against Tottenham Hotspur on 26 October 1996. The Tottenham match was an emotional and incident packed game for Lee and his teammates. It was the first match since the death of Chelsea chairman Matthew Harding. Lee scored a penalty to put Chelsea in the lead, but was later stretchered off with a broken leg as a result of a challenge from Sol Campbell.

Seeking regular football, Lee joined Bristol Rovers on a free transfer in 1998 and later had spells at Crystal Palace, Exeter City, Parramatta Power, Havant & Waterlooville and Forest Green Rovers.

Coaching career
Lee was chief scout with Bristol City from June 2010 until he resigned on 16 May 2011 citing a wish for a new challenge. In June 2011 Lee was appointed as assistant manager to Gary Johnson at Northampton Town. After Johnson left Northampton by mutual consent in November 2011, Lee was placed in temporary charge of the first team, assisted by player-coach Andy Holt. Lee lasted only one game in charge of Northampton; a 7–2 defeat to Shrewsbury Town, before being replaced on 22 November by Tim Flowers.

References

External links

1969 births
Living people
English footballers
England under-21 international footballers
People from Kingswood, South Gloucestershire
Sportspeople from Gloucestershire
Bristol Rovers F.C. players
Chelsea F.C. players
Colchester United F.C. players
Crystal Palace F.C. players
Exeter City F.C. players
Forest Green Rovers F.C. players
Havant & Waterlooville F.C. players
Mangotsfield United F.C. players
Parramatta Power players
Premier League players
Plymouth Argyle F.C. players
Portsmouth F.C. players
Reading F.C. players
Sheffield United F.C. players
English Football League players
Weston-super-Mare A.F.C. players
Yate Town F.C. players
English expatriate sportspeople in Australia
Northampton Town F.C. managers
Bristol City F.C. non-playing staff
Association football central defenders
English football managers